The list of ship launches in 1769 includes a chronological list of some ships launched in 1769.


References

1769
Ship launches